Future Past may refer to:

 Future Past (Duncan James album), released in 2006
 Future Past (Duran Duran album), released in 2021
 Future Past (film), a 1987 Australian science fiction film